Karin Ugowski (née Komischke; born 11 July 1943) is a German actress, narrator, film producer and furtherer of art and culture in Germany with various stations of work in UK, France, Italy, Israel, Russia, Hungary, Poland, Spain, US and Germany.

Early life 

Karin Ugowski was born in Berlin Johannisthal, Germany during the last stage of The Battle of Berlin in the middle of the Berlin bombings, 2 years before the end of Second World War. She grew up in postwar Germany behind the Iron Curtain and her parents were both wartime traumatized. After finishing Gymnasiale Oberstufe (comparable to Highschool in US) she was intended to study medicine. Against the will of her parents she attended to the Film University Babelsberg in 1962 and received her B.A. in drama from the Film University Babelsberg, Germany in 1965. She has a younger brother.

Career 

During her acting studies she already gained notice and received widespread recognition for her enchanting but self-confident impersonations of the princess roles in German classic theatrical motion pictures in the early 1960s based on historical fairy tales, like Mother Holly (1963), The Golden Goose (1964) and King Thrushbeard (1965) co-starring German cult actor Manfred Krug. Her first cinema appearances were heavily related to an ideal of female youth and beauty in the 1960s of postwar Germany. In this time she already became an up-and-coming film star building a fan base, which still remains until today for these old film classics, which are still airing in German TV frequently.

In early science fiction motion pictures like Signale – Ein Weltraumabenteuer (1970) (English: "Signals") and in historical feature films like the spy thriller The Invisible Visor (1973) which has already achieved cult status, co-starring the young Armin Mueller-Stahl, or as the malicious white farmers daughter in the German film version of the American Indian legend story Osceola (1971) or even in first episodes of the German TV classic crime series Police call 110, where she appears as one of the first officiating female police detectives and inspectors besides the actress Sigrid Göhler in German TV, she has so much the more astounded and irritated her fan base knowing her from the princess roles by showing completely different faces in the 1970s and exposing as character actress of complex parts. More than once she has surprised with her versatility, as shown again in the more recent years, like in the cinema short film Open (2005) of the director Charlotte Siebenrock, when she turned from an old frustrated canteen kitchen porter into an attractive buoyant and beautiful looking women within minutes, leading to the presentation of the short film at various short film festivals or in the motion picture In All Colours of the Rainbow (2007) in a role of an older woman falling in love with a much younger man fighting the social resentment, directed by her son, Sebastian Ugovsky.

Already during her first film work she fell in love with theater, especially the experimental and political theatre, which was able to change something in the time of upheaval in Germany. As a permanent company member of the Volksbuehne Berlin theatre, she worked early with great personalities such as Benno Besson, Heiner Müller and later Frank Castorf, Johann Kresnik, Leander Haußmann, Christoph Schlingensief and other Berlin theater-greats with guest performances all over the world. This is how she became a member of the political movement Neues Forum in the late 1980s, supporting the political rally in November 1989 at the Berlin Alexanderplatz, which was part of the Fall of the Berlin Wall and the lifting of the Iron Curtain leading to the end of the Cold War.

The actress, who has frequently campaigned for art and culture support and development in Germany in the last decades and has carried a yearly exhibition festival with her husband to support artists in this area, became a talking point recently again by participating in a supporting role as mother of the lead in Samuel Maoz's latest international motion picture Foxtrot (Israel, 2017), a sequel of his award-winning motion picture Lebanon (2009), which will likely screen in Cannes and won the Silver lion (Grand Prix de Jury) at the Biennale 2017/18.

In all, the actress was involved in over 80 theater productions and over 150 film and television productions. Politically, Karin Ugowski can be considered as critical of any system, reasoned by her own history and which is mirrored in her commitment for political theater and various interpretive readings up to today. Since 2006, Karin Ugowski is an active member of the German Film Academy and member of the jury for the German film award (LOLA).

Personal life 

During her acting studies in the time when she came to be known for her first motion picture appearances in the 1960s, she met her first husband Eberhart Ugowski and married very quickly. In this time her first son was born. Even if the marriage only lasted for a few years, her last name by which she is known (Ugowski) remains from this marriage. Since then she kept the name even after the divorce in 1967 because of the name recognition.

In the 1970s, she was in a long-term relationship with the actor and well-known theater director Helmut Straßburger she met when working with him on theater stagings, bringing her second son into the world: the author, play wright, independent Stage Director and film maker, composer and Music Producer Sebastian Ugovsky (sometimes credited as Gilmano for musical works), the founder of the music record label REQQORD (formerly Slo' Jam) in Berlin, Germany, who has contributed music titles to film scores of motion pictures like The Equalizer (2014, Denzel Washington).

Ugowski has cultivated a long-term friendship with the author and play wright Peter Brasch, brother of also well-known author, poet and play write Thomas Brasch and the actor Klaus Brasch. The parents of the Brasch brothers were Jewish immigrants to the UK in the late 1930s during the pogrom in Germany and moved back to Germany after the end of Second World War, which made both authors, Thomas and Peter, being strongly driven by the dream for eternal peace and freedom of thought in their work, a common ground between the Braschs and Karin Ugowski. Peter Brasch had a crash on Karin Ugowski and has dedicated a book of poetry to her (inscription) and wrote another radio play called The Golden Goose – an audio drama adaptation in 1989 inspired by her role of princess Roswitha in the classic movie. He died in 2001. He was one of the first having insights in the first writings of Karin Ugowski's son Sebastian Ugovsky.

Since 1993, she has been married to painter and scenographer Günter Horn, the last living advisee of the famous painter Otto Nagel.

Filmography 

A selection of Cinema and TV motion pictures.

Theatrography 

A selection.

References

External links 
 
 Official website (karin-ugowski.com)
 Karin Ugowski in the archive of the DEFA foundation (defa-stiftung.de)
 Karin Ugowski in the OFDb Database (ofdb.de)

1943 births
Living people
Actresses from Berlin
German film actresses
German stage actresses
German television actresses
German voice actresses
German women film producers
People from Treptow-Köpenick
20th-century German actresses